Jack Sells The Cow is the 18th full-length solo studio album released by singer-songwriter Robert Pollard since 1996.

Track listing

All songs written by Robert Pollard.

"Heaven Is a Gated Community"
"Take In"
"Who's Running My Ranch?"
"Up for All That"
"Pontius Pilate Heart"
"Big Groceries"
"Fighting the Smoke"
"The Rank of a Nurse"
"Tight but Normal Squeeze"
"Red Rubber Army"
"The March of Merrillville"
"Winter Comes to Those Who Pray"

References

2012 albums
Robert Pollard albums
Fire Records (UK) albums